2013–14 Superliga may refer to:

2013–14 Danish Superliga
2013–14 Romanian Superliga (women's football)